Erik Valter Hysén (18 May 1906 – 25 April 1988) was a Swedish footballer who played as a midfielder. He played for IFK Göteborg between 1926 and 1938. He was the brother of Carl Hysén, the grandfather of Glenn Hysén, and the great-grandfather of Tobias Hysén, Alexander Hysén, and Antonio Hysén.

Honours 
IFK Göteborg

 Allsvenskan: 1934–35

References 

1906 births
1988 deaths
Swedish footballers
Allsvenskan players
Association football midfielders
IFK Göteborg players
People from Härryda Municipality